The Off-Season Tour  was a co-headlining concert tour by American recording artist J. Cole, and rapper 21 Savage, in support of Cole's sixth studio album The Off-Season (2021). The tour began on September 24, 2021 in Miami at the FTX Arena, and concluded on April 3, 2022 in Raleigh at his second Dreamville Festival.

Background and development
On June 21, 2021, J. Cole posted a teaser on his official Twitter and Instagram accounts, respectively, asking his fans if he should tour for his album, The Off-Season, asking, "Should I tour this one?". He followed up the teaser the next day on June 22 by officially announcing the dates of the tour, along with announcing his co-headliner, 21 Savage, and support for the tour, Morray.

On June 23, 2021, Spotify held a presale for early access to tickets via Ticketmaster, while all venues held their own presale the following day. General sale for the tour began on June 25th, both also via Ticketmaster.

On September 19, 2021, American comedian Druski, along with Cole's manager Ibrahim Hamad, and record label Dreamville announced that Druski would be an additional opener and "host" for the tour. An add-on date meet and greet package to meet Druski was released to the public for every arena show date the following day on September 20.

Set lists
These set lists are representative of the show on September 25, 2021 in Orlando. They are not representative of all concerts for the duration of the tour.

J. Cole

 "Punchin' the Clock" (Introduction)
 "95 South"
 "Amari"
 "Applying Pressure"
 "100 Mil'" (with Bas)
 "Let Go My Hand" (with Bas)
 "A Tale of 2 Citiez"
 "G.O.M.D."
 "Wet Dreamz"
 "Back to the Topic"
 "Nobody's Perfect"
 "Work Out"
 "Can't Get Enough"
 "Power Trip"
 "Under the Sun"
 "Down Bad" (with Bas)
 "The Jackie" (with Bas)
 "The Climb Back"
 "Close"
 "Pride Is the Devil"
 "A Lot" (with 21 Savage)
 "Quicksand" (with Morray)
 "My Life" (with 21 Savage & Morray)
 "No Role Modelz"
 "The London"
 "Planez"
 "Middle Child"

21 Savage

 "Don't Come Out the House"
 "10 Freaky Girls"
 "Runnin"
 "Red Opps"
 "Mr. Right Now"
 "rockstar"
 "Knife Talk"
 "No Heart"
 "X"
 "Bank Account"

Tour dates

References

Notes

References

2021 concert tours
J. Cole